Nicetas  is a genus of moths of the family Erebidae. The genus was erected by Herbert Druce in 1891.

Species
Nicetas annon H. Druce, 1891 Mexico
Nicetas antonialis Schaus, 1916 Jamaica
Nicetas bathalis Schaus, 1916 Jamaica
Nicetas biciliata (Warren, 1889) Brazil (Amazonas)
Nicetas lycon H. Druce, 1891 Panama
Nicetas panamensis H. Druce, 1891 Costa Rica, Panama

References

Herminiinae